Dudley Jamieson (4 July 1912 – 14 January 1979) was an Australian cricketer. He played in eight first-class matches for South Australia between 1931 and 1933.

See also
 List of South Australian representative cricketers

References

External links
 

1912 births
1979 deaths
Australian cricketers
South Australia cricketers
Cricketers from Adelaide